One human poll made up the 2008 National Association of Intercollegiate Athletics (NAIA) football rankings, sometimes called the NAIA Coaches' Poll or the football ratings. Once the regular season was complete, the NAIA sponsored a 16-team playoff to determine the year's national champion. A final poll was then taken after completion of the 2008 NAIA Football National Championship.

Poll release dates 
The poll release dates were:
 April 21, 2008 (Spring)
 August 11, 2008 (Preseason)
 September 15, 2008
 September 22, 2008
 September 29, 2008
 October 6, 2008
 October 13, 2008
 October 20, 2008
 October 27, 2008
 November 3, 2008
 November 10, 2008
 November 16, 2008 (Final)
 January 12, 2009 (Postseason)

Week by week poll

Leading vote-getters 
Since the inception of the Coaches' Poll in 1999, the #1 ranking in the various weekly polls has been held by only a select group of teams. Through the postseason poll of the 2008 season, the teams and the number of times they have held the #1 weekly ranking are shown below. The number of times a team has been ranked #1 in the postseason poll (the national champion) is shown in parentheses.

In 1999, the results of a postseason poll, if one was conducted, are not known. Therefore, an additional poll has been presumed, and the #1 postseason ranking has been credited to the postseason tournament champion, the Northwestern Oklahoma State Rangers.

References 

Rankings
NAIA football rankings